is a  mountain located in Motegi, Tochigi Prefecture, Japan.

From the Motegi train station it is a thirty-minute walk northeast.

Seasonal festivals are held on its top. In autumn the colors of its tree leaves are very beautiful and in spring its cherry blossoms are very beautiful.

There was also said to be a castle on top of it from 1197.

External links
もてぎプラザ/城山公園 Information in Japanese.
茂木城山公園 Seasonal photographs of the park on the top of Mount Shiroyama.

Shiroyama